Jeffrey Scott Richardson (born August 26, 1965, in Grand Island, Nebraska) is an American former professional infielder. He played during three seasons at the Major League Baseball (MLB) for the Cincinnati Reds, Pittsburgh Pirates, and Boston Red Sox. He was drafted by the Reds in the 7th round of the 1986 Major League Baseball draft. He played college baseball for Louisiana Tech.

References
"Jeff Richardson Statistics". The Baseball Cube. 23 January 2008.
"Jeff Richardson Statistics". Baseball-Reference. 23 January 2008.

External links

1965 births
Living people
American expatriate baseball players in Canada
Baseball players from Nebraska
Billings Mustangs players
Boston Red Sox players
Buffalo Bisons (minor league) players
Calgary Cannons players
Chattanooga Lookouts players
Cincinnati Reds players
Edmonton Trappers players
Louisiana Tech Bulldogs baseball coaches
Louisiana Tech Bulldogs baseball players
Louisville Redbirds players
Major League Baseball infielders
Nashville Sounds players
Pawtucket Red Sox players
People from Grand Island, Nebraska
Pittsburgh Pirates players
Tampa Tarpons (1957–1987) players
Vermont Reds players
Little Rock Trojans baseball players